Tibor Pető (born 27 December 1980 in Vác) is a Hungarian rower. Together with Ákos Haller he finished 5th in the men's double sculls at the 2000 Summer Olympics.

References
 
 

1980 births
Living people
Hungarian male rowers
Rowers at the 2000 Summer Olympics
Olympic rowers of Hungary
People from Vác
World Rowing Championships medalists for Hungary
Sportspeople from Pest County